Abram Fulkerson (May 13, 1834 – December 17, 1902) was a Confederate officer during the American Civil War, and a Virginia lawyer and politician who helped form the short-lived Virginia Readjuster Party. He served in both houses of the Virginia General Assembly, as well as the U.S. House of Representatives, after which he published accounts of his wartime exploits and captivity.

Family and early life
Fulkerson was born on May 13, 1834, in Washington County, Virginia, the youngest son of Abram Fulkerson Sr. (1789–1859) of Lee County, Virginia and his wife Margaret Laughlin Vance (1796–1864). His family took pride in their military heritage. His grandfather, James Fulkerson, had also served as a Captain, in the Virginia Militia during the American Revolution, joining with the Overmountain Men and fighting the British at the Battle of Kings Mountain. His father, Abram Fulkerson Sr., had served during the War of 1812 as a captain of a Virginia Militia company in Colonel David Sanders' Regiment, 4th Brigade, Norfolk Division under Gen. Peter B. Porter, but by 1850 had moved to Grainger County, Tennessee, where his eldest son James L. Fulkerson died, although Abram Fulkerson Sr. moved back to Washington County, Virginia, before his death in 1859. The family included at least four more sons who survived to adulthood: James Lyon Fulkerson (1816–1849), Samuel Vance Fulkerson (1822–1862), Francis Marion Fulkerson (1825–1894) and Isaac Fulkerson (1831–1889). They also had daughters Mary Vance Fulkerson Davis (1820–1892), Harriet Jane Fulkerson Armstrong (1827–1911) and Katherine Elizabeth Fulkerson (1832–1903).

Abram Jr. graduated from the Virginia Military Institute at Lexington in 1857, where he was a student of Prof. Thomas Jonathan Stonewall Jackson, as had been his elder brother Samuel Vance Fulkerson (1822–1862), who had served in the Mexican–American War and as a delegate to the Virginia Constitutional Convention of 1850. According to VMI records, Isaac Fulkerson had a reputation for being a prankster and wore an "outlandish collar" on his cadet uniform: the collar being the only part of the uniform not covered under regulations. After graduation, he taught school in Palmyra, Virginia, then in 1860 in Rogersville, Hawkins County, Tennessee.

Confederate officer
Fulkerson entered Confederate military service in June 1861 as a Captain, having organized a company of men from Hawkins County, Tennessee, that was mustered into the 19th Tennessee Infantry Regiment as Company K (The Hawkins Boys) at Knoxville, Tennessee. His was the first company of volunteers organized in East Tennessee, and Abram Fulkerson received a commission as the regiment's Major. He was wounded in the thigh and his horse shot from under him at the Battle of Shiloh. After recovery and the unit's reorganization, he was reassigned to the 63rd Tennessee Infantry. Commissioned as Lieutenant Colonel of the 63rd, and President Jefferson Davis on February 12, 1864, commissioned him as a full colonel.

In January 1862, Abram Fulkerson received a furlough and went to Clarksville, Tennessee and married his fiancé, Selina Johnson (1832–1918) on January 28. They were barely married in time to escape the Union Army's advance on Clarksville.  In June, 1862 his brother Col. Samuel Vance Fulkerson was killed in action leading the 37th Virginia Infantry at the Battle of Gaines Mill, the first major victory of General Robert E. Lee.  Another brother, Isaac Fulkerson (c. 1829-July 20, 1889), was a captain in the 8th Texas Cavalry (Terry's Texas Rangers).

Abram Fulkerson twice helped garrison the Cumberland Gap: first with the 19th Tennessee then with the 63rd Tennessee. On May 18, 1863, while at Cumberland Gap, he penned a letter to his wife in which he noted that he was visited there by President Jefferson Davis:

One of our pickets came in the other day and reported that a Mr. Davis was at the lines and desired to enter. This report took me very much by surprise, for although you had mentioned the probability of his coming yet I did not look for him. He only stayed a few hours. After dinner (a very poor one without apology to him) I went [around] to show him some of the curiosities of Cumberland Gap, which he seemed to think would compensate any one for making the visit. He went back up the valley and expected to get home by Wednesday next.

In the same letter, he addressed the news of General Stonewall Jackson's death:

The intelligence of the death of Gen. Jackson came upon us like a shock. We feel that his death is a national calamity. The poorest soldiers among us appreciated his worth - loved the man, and mourn his loss. I knew him well.1 He was my preceptor for more than four years and whilst during that time I did not appreciate the man, as school [schoolboys?]are not like to do, yet I always had great reverence for the man on account of his piety & uprightness of character. Among the many heroes of this revolution, none have lived so much adored, none have died so much deplored, and none have left a character as spotless as that of Stonewall Jackson. Could his life have been spared till the close of this cruel war, the unanimous voice of a grateful people would have proclaimed him chief ruler of the nation. But God has seen proper to take him from us, and what He does is right and for the best. It is [illegible] therefore that we make the sacrifice cheerfully, th'o we cannot see why our country should be deprived of his services at his her hour of greatest need.

Prisoner of war

While in the 63rd, Fulkerson was wounded twice more: in the left arm at the Battle of Chickamauga and again at the Second Battle of Petersburg, Virginia (Battle of Petersburg II), the regiment having been reassigned from the Army of Tennessee to the Army of Northern Virginia. He was taken prisoner on June 17, 1864, and sent to the POW camp at Fort Delaware.

On April 18, 1892, Fulkerson wrote an account of his capture and experiences as a prisoner.  He related the events of his capture:

While a POW, Fulkerson became part of the Immortal Six Hundred, 600 captured Confederate officers who were taken to Morris Island at Charleston, South Carolina and used as human shields by the Union Army for six weeks in an attempt to silence the Confederate gunners at Fort Sumter, in response to Union officer prisoners being placed among civilians to stop Union gunners from firing into downtown Charleston. Though none of the Immortal Six Hundred were killed by the continuing Confederate artillery fire from Fort Sumter, 14 died of dysentery.

Of his time on Morris Island he wrote in the same 1892 account:

After Morris Island, Fulkerson was taken to Fort Pulaski and placed on starvation rations for 42 days in retaliation for Confederate prisoner abuses at Andersonville. Crowded into the fort's cold, damp casements, the Confederates' "retaliation ration" consisted of 10 ounces of moldy cornmeal and a half pint of soured onion pickles. The starving men supplemented their rations with the occasional rat or stray cat. Thirteen men died there of preventable diseases such as dysentery and scurvy.

At Fort Pulaski, the prisoners organized "The Relief Association of Fort Pulaski for Aid and Relief of the Sick and Less Fortunate Prisoners" on December 13, 1864, and Fulkerson was elected president. Out of their sparse funds, the prisoners collected and spent eleven dollars, according to a report filed by Fulkerson on December 28, 1864.

In March 1865 Fulkerson was returned to Fort Delaware, where he was discharged and paroled on July 25, 1865, months after General Robert E. Lee's surrender at Appomattox.

While at Fort Delaware, prisoners were taken out to the badly polluted river every day and allowed to bathe and swim. Fulkerson, a very thin man with auburn hair, could float "like a cork" and would lie on his back and float out with the current for ten or fifteen minutes until the nervous guards, fearing that an escape attempt, ordered him to return to the shore.

After Fulkerson returned home, his horse that he rode during his military service, whose official name was "Zollicoffer" (after former Congressman and early Confederate casualty Felix Zollicoffer), was returned to him. Fulkerson kept the horse for the rest of its life, but called him "Old Bob." When the horse died, former Confederates from the Bristol area assembled and conducted a military funeral for it. In 1885, Stonewall Jackson's horse, "Little Sorrel," was brought to Bristol on a tour and Fulkerson rode it as a number of former veterans assembled to pay their respects.

Legal and political career
As the war ended, Fulkerson studied law, was admitted to the bar and began his legal practice in Goodson, later known as Bristol, Virginia, in 1866 with the firm of York & Fulkerson.  As a lawyer, he was regarded as a legal giant in Bristol and it is said that he was such a gifted orator that many of the local citizens would go to court and sit in on trials just to hear him speak.

Fulkerson was elected and re-elected to the Virginia House of Delegates as one of two delegates representing Washington County, Virginia (part-time). He served from 1871 to 1875, until voters replaced both delegates. Next he served in the State senate of Virginia 1877–1881.

Voters from Virginia's 9th congressional district elected Fulkerson as a Readjuster Democrat from to the Forty-seventh Congress (March 4, 1881 – March 3, 1883). He defeating incumbent James Buchanan Richmond, a lawyer and banker (and former subordinate officer to his brother Samuel in the 37th Virginia), in the Democratic primary. Fulkerson helped organize the Readjuster Party, after which he returned to the Democratic Party.

Fulkerson resumed his legal practice after deciding against seeking re-election to Congress. Fellow Readjuster Henry Bowen succeeded him. Voters again elected Fulkerson to the State House of Delegates in 1888, alongside John A. Buchanan who together replaced Daniel Trigg and Jonas S. Kelly and were in turn replaced in 1887 by John Roberts and S. P. Edmonson.

After retiring from politics, Fulkerson wrote a memoir of his captivity and published it in 1894. Fulkerson was a delegate to the Democratic National (Gold) Convention in 1896.

Death and legacy
Fulkerson died in Bristol, Virginia, on December 17, 1902, at the age of 68, of complications after suffering a stroke. He was buried there in East Hill Cemetery in Sullivan County, Tennessee. Henry Clinton Wood who served as the Major of the 37th Virginia Infantry (CS) under Fulkerson's brother Samuel Vance, and for whom the town of Clintwood, Virginia, was named, served as an honorary pallbearer in the funeral. His widow would survive for a decade, and his son Samuel Vance Fulkerson (1863–1926), although he married in Grayson, Texas, would become a Virginia lawyer and die aged 64 in Virginia Beach on July 2, 1926, and be buried in the same cemetery.

VMI maintains the Fulkerson family papers in its library's archives. The Sons of Confederate Veterans Abram Fulkerson Camp 2104 in Greeley, Colorado, bears his name.

His descendant third cousin, Joe Adkins, portrays Fulkerson at Civil War reenactments. A member of the Sons of Confederate Veterans, Adkins commands the Gen. Alfred E. Jackson Camp 2159 in Jonesborough, Tennessee.

References

Further reading

 Worsham, Dr. W. J., The Old Nineteenth Tennessee Regiment C.S.A. The Guild Bindery Press, 1992.
 Fowler, John D., Mountaineers in Gray: The Nineteenth Tennessee Volunteer Infantry Regiment, C.S.A. The University of Tennessee Press, 2004, .
 Obituary for Abram Fulkerson, Confederate Veteran Magazine, 1903.

External links
 Samuel Vance Fulkerson
 James Fulkerson

1834 births
1902 deaths
People from Washington County, Virginia
Democratic Party members of the Virginia House of Delegates
Confederate States Army officers
American Civil War prisoners of war
People of Tennessee in the American Civil War
Virginia lawyers
Democratic Party members of the United States House of Representatives from Virginia
19th-century American politicians
Readjuster Party politicians